Sefwi-Wiawso Municipal District is one of the nine districts in Western North Region, Ghana. Originally created as an ordinary district assembly in 1988 when it was known as Sefwi-Wiawso District, until the southwest part of the district was split off to create Sefwi-Akontombra District on 29 February 2008; thus the remaining part has been retained as Sefwi-Wiawso District, which it was later elevated to municipal district assembly status in March 2012 (effectively 28 June 2012) to become Sefwi-Wiawso Municipal District. The municipality is located in the northeast part of Western North Region and has Wiawso as its capital town.

See also
Sefwi-Wiawso (Ghana parliament constituency)

Sources
 
 GhanaDistricts.com

References

Districts of the Western North Region